Sheena Knowles is an Australian author of children's books.

Born in Geelong, Victoria, she currently lives in Victoria.

She is the author of the picture book Edward the Emu, which was illustrated by Rod Clement, and shortlisted for the 1989 Australian Children's Picture Book of the Year. A companion title, Edwina the Emu, was published in 1997.  Edward the Emu was selected as the book read for Australia's 2001 National Simultaneous Storytime. It inspired a musical composition for narrator, oboe, clarinet, bassoon, percussion, and string quartet by Peter Webb.
Knowles previously worked for Diversitat, a local non-profit organisation. In the 1980s and 1990s she worked in advertising.

Selected works

References 

Australian children's writers
Living people
People from Geelong
Year of birth missing (living people)
Australian women children's writers